The Lockheed Fire was a wildfire in the Santa Cruz Mountains in the Swanton and Bonny Doon areas of Santa Cruz County, California. The fire was started on August 12, 2009 at 7:16 PM PDT.

A Red Cross shelter was established at Vintage Faith Church in Santa Cruz for families who were evacuated from the area. An animal evacuation center was also established at the Santa Cruz County Fairgrounds.

Many resources were demanded for this fire. The steep terrain and lack of road access in the area made it difficult to fight the blaze.

The cause of the fire was determined to be an out of control or unattended camp fire.

References

External links
 Santa Cruz Sentinel Article on Lockheed Fire

 Imperial Valley News Article on Lockheed Fire
 Mercury News Article on Lockheed Fire
 CalFire Incident page on Lockheed Fire

2009 California wildfires
Wildfires in Santa Cruz County, California
August 2009 events in the United States
Santa Cruz Mountains